Cijeli moj svijet is the debut studio album by Bosnian pop singer and Zvijezda možeš biti ti Season 5 winner Denial Ahmetović. It was released 23 May 2014 through Hayat Production.

Background
In 2012 Ahmetović auditioned for the fifth season of the televised Bosnian singing contest Zvijezda možeš biti ti on Hayat TV. He became the winner on 12 April 2013.

Singles
The album's lead single "Nema ljubavi dok je Bosna ne rodi" was released 19 April 2013. The lyrics were written by Marina Tucaković and Miligram musician Aleksandar Milić, with music also by Milić.

The second single "Cijeli moj svijet", written by Eldin Huseinbegović, premiered 19 July 2013.

Release and artwork
Cijeli moj svijet was released 23 May 2014 through the record label Hayat Production. The cover photo was shot by Jasmin Fazlagić.

Track listing

References

2014 albums
Hayat Production albums